Une minute de soleil en moins is a drama film directed by French-Moroccan director Nabil Ayouch and broadcast in 2003. Commissioned by the cultural channel Arte, it is part of the "Masculin/Féminin" collection of films by ten directors.

Synopsis 
Kamel Raoui, a young police inspector, is assigned to investigate the murder of Hakim Tahiri, a major drug trafficker. The first suspect is his employee and mistress: Touria, a young woman who lives at the scene of the crime with her younger brother, Pipo. While Touria is placed in custody, Kamel takes Pipo into his home and bonds with the child.

References

External links 

 

French drama films
2003 drama films
2000s French films